Ana Lúcia Souza (born 10 June 1982, in São Paulo, Brazil) is a Brazilian naturalized American ballet dancer, filmmaker, and journalist. Souza was a soloist  at the extinct Das Meininger Ballett, the Stuttgart Ballet, and Les Ballets de Monte Carlo in the Principality of Monaco. In New York, Souza worked as an on-camera correspondent for Brazilian Rede TV network and E! Entertainment Latin America, produced and directed Manhattan Connection's segment with host Pedro Andrade and other independent and commercial productions. Previous work also include the Lee Strasberg Theater and Film Institute, episodic TV (The First, on Hulu), and on commercial and independent film. In 2018, Ana launched a stationary line named Ana.Logica.

References 

1982 births
Living people
Brazilian ballerinas
People from São Paulo